This is a timeline of the development of prophylactic human vaccines. Early vaccines may be listed by the first year of development or testing, but later entries usually show the year the vaccine finished trials and became available on the market. Although vaccines exist for the diseases listed below, only smallpox has been eliminated worldwide. The other vaccine-preventable illnesses continue to cause millions of deaths each year. Currently, polio and measles are the targets of active worldwide eradication campaigns.

18th century
1796 – Edward Jenner develops and documents first vaccine for smallpox.

19th century
 1880 – First vaccine for cholera by Louis Pasteur
 1885 – First vaccine for rabies by Louis Pasteur and Émile Roux
 1890 – First vaccine for tetanus (serum antitoxin) by Emil von Behring
 1896 – First vaccine for typhoid fever by Almroth Edward Wright, Richard Pfeiffer, and Wilhelm Kolle
 1897 – First vaccine for bubonic plague by Waldemar Haffkine

20th century
 1921 – First vaccine for tuberculosis by Albert Calmette
 1923 – First vaccine for diphtheria by Gaston Ramon, Emil von Behring and Kitasato Shibasaburō
 1924 – First vaccine for scarlet fever by George F. Dick and Gladys Dick
 1924 – First inactive vaccine for tetanus (tetanus toxoid, TT) by Gaston Ramon, C. Zoeller and P. Descombey
 1926 – First vaccine for pertussis (whooping cough) by Leila Denmark
 1932 – First vaccine for yellow fever by Max Theiler and Jean Laigret
 1937 – First vaccine for typhus by Rudolf Weigl, Ludwik Fleck and Hans Zinsser
 1937 – First vaccine for influenza by Anatol Smorodintsev
 1941 – First vaccine for tick-borne encephalitis
 1952 – First vaccine for polio (Salk vaccine)
 1954 – First vaccine for Japanese encephalitis
 1954 – First vaccine for anthrax
 1957 – First vaccine for adenovirus-4 and 7
 1962 – First oral polio vaccine (Sabin vaccine)
 1963 – First vaccine for measles
 1967 – First vaccine for mumps
 1970 – First vaccine for rubella 
 1977 – First vaccine for pneumonia (Streptococcus pneumoniae)
 1978 – First vaccine for meningitis (Neisseria meningitidis)
 1980 – Smallpox declared eradicated worldwide due to vaccination efforts
 1981 – First vaccine for hepatitis B (first vaccine to target a cause of cancer)
 1984 – First vaccine for chicken pox
 1985 – First vaccine for Haemophilus influenzae type b (HiB)
 1989 – First vaccine for Q fever
 1990 – First vaccine for Hantavirus hemorrhagic fever with renal syndrome
 1991 – First vaccine for hepatitis A
 1998 – First vaccine for Lyme disease
 1998 – First vaccine for rotavirus

21st century
 2000 – First pneumococcal conjugate vaccine approved in the US (PCV7 or Prevnar)
2003 – First nasal influenza vaccine approved in U.S. (FluMist)
2003 – First vaccine for Argentine hemorrhagic fever.
 2006 – First vaccine for human papillomavirus (which is a cause of cervical cancer)
2006 – First herpes zoster vaccine for shingles
 2012 – First vaccine for hepatitis E
 2012 – First quadrivalent (4-strain) influenza vaccine
 2013 – First vaccine for enterovirus 71, one cause of hand, foot, and mouth disease 
 2015 – First vaccine for malaria
 2015 – First vaccine for dengue fever
 2019 – First vaccine for Ebola approved
 2020 – First vaccine for COVID-19.

Under development
 Cytomegalovirus vaccine
 Epstein–Barr virus vaccine
 Hepatitis C vaccine
 Herpes simplex vaccine
 HIV vaccine
 Respiratory syncytial virus vaccine
 Zika virus vaccine
 Lyme disease vaccine

See also 
 Timeline of global health
 History of smallpox
 List of diseases eliminated from the United States

Sources

keepkidshealthy claims "References: the CDC and Mandell: Principles and Practice of Infectious Diseases, 5th ed.," as its source.

Vaccines
Timeline